The year 1945 in television involved some significant events.
Below is a list of television-related events during 1945.



Events
July - The final months of World War II continued to disrupt television operations in Europe until July.
October 1 – The U.S. War Production Board ends its wartime ban of the manufacture of radio and television equipment for consumer use.
October 10 –  Reopening of French TV station RDF in 441-line standard.
December 1 – US Army-Navy football game is transmitted 145 kilometers (90 mi) by coaxial cable from Philadelphia to New York City.
December 15 – Moscow TV center reinstated regular TV broadcasting after World War II.
December 17 – First weather programme on French television.

Television shows

Programs ending

Births
January 9 
John Doman, actor, The Wire, Gotham
Michael Jaffe, American TV and film producer
January 22 – Steve Vinovich, actor
January 25
Jill Townsend, actress, Cimarron Strip, Poldark
Leigh Taylor-Young, actress, Peyton Place
January 26 – Jacqueline Ray, actress
January 29 – Tom Selleck, actor, Magnum, P.I., Blue Bloods
February 6 - Michael Tucker, actor, L.A. Law
February 9 - Mia Farrow, actress, model, Peyton Place
February 20 – George Smoot, American astrophysicist
February 22 – Leslie Charleson, American soap actress, General Hospital
February 24 - Barry Bostwick, actor, Spin City, Phineas and Ferb
February 26 – Marta Kristen, Norwegian actress, Lost in Space
March 1 – Dirk Benedict, actor, Battlestar Galactica, The A-Team
March 3 - Hattie Winston, actress, The Electric Company, Becker
March 5 - George Crile III, American journalist (died 2006)
March 8 – Micky Dolenz, singer, actor, The Monkees
March 31 - Gabe Kaplan, actor, comedian, Welcome Back, Kotter
April 1 - Heather Young, actress, Land of the Giants
April 2 - Linda Hunt, actress, NCIS: Los Angeles
April 13 – Tony Dow, actor, Leave It to Beaver (died 2022)
April 23 – François Clemmons, actor
May 7 - Robin Strasser, actress, One Life to Live
May 10 - Bill Geist, television journalist
May 12 - Linda Carlson, actress (died 2021)
May 21 – Richard Hatch, actor, Battlestar Galactica (died 2017)
May 22 - Victoria Wyndham, actress, Another World
May 23 - Lauren Chapin, actress, Father Knows Best
May 24 – Priscilla Presley, actress
June 1 – Kerry Vincent, Australian chef and author (died 2021)
June 2 
Joan Pringle, actress, General Hospital, The White Shadow
Jon Peters, film producer
Lord David Dundas, actor
June 6 – David Dukes, actor (died 2000)
June 11 – Adrienne Barbeau, actress, Maude
June 27 – Clive Clark, golfer
July 3 – Mickey Rooney Jr., actor (died 2022)
July 6 – Burt Ward, actor, Batman
July 10 – Ron Glass, actor, Barney Miller (died 2016)
July 13 – Penelope Windust, actress (died 2022)
July 23 – Edie McClurg, actress
July 24 – Lowell Bergman, producer
July 26 – Helen Mirren, actress
August 1 - Laila Morse, actress
August 5 - Loni Anderson, actress, WKRP in Cincinnati
August 14 
Steve Martin, actor, comedian
Brenda Benet, actress (died 1982)
August 16 - Bob Balaban, actor
August 22 
Steve Kroft, American retired journalist
David Chase, American producer
August 24 – Vince McMahon, businessman
September 1 
Valdy, musician
Edd Kalehoff, musician
September 10 - Dennis Burkley, actor (died 2013)
September 12 - Maria Aitken, actress
September 19 - Randolph Mantooth, actor, Emergency!
September 23 - Paul Petersen, actor
September 25 - Catherine Burns, actress (died 2019)
October 4 - Clifton Davis, actor, That's My Mama, Amen
October 13 – Susan Stafford, hostess
October 18 – Huell Howser, host of California's Gold (died 2013)
October 19 – John Lithgow, actor, Third Rock from the Sun
October 20 – George Wyner, actor
October 21 - Everett McGill, actor, Twin Peaks
October 26 – Jaclyn Smith, actress, Charlie's Angels
October 27 – Carrie Snodgress, actress (died 2004)
October 30 – Henry Winkler, actor, Arthur Fonzarelli on Happy Days
October 31 - Brian Doyle-Murray, actor, comedian, Saturday Night Live, SpongeBob SquarePants, Teamo Supremo, The Buzz on Maggie, My Gym Partner's a Monkey, The Marvelous Misadventures of Flapjack, Kick Buttowski: Suburban Daredevil
November 9 - Charlie Robinson, actor, Night Court (died 2021)
November 15 - Bob Gunton, actor, Daredevil
November 21 – Goldie Hawn, actress, Rowan and Martin's Laugh-In
November 26 – Daniel Davis, actor, The Nanny
November 27
Barbara Anderson, actress, Ironside
James Avery, actor, The Fresh Prince of Bel-Air (died 2013)
December 1 – Bette Midler, actress, singer
December 9 – Michael Nouri, actor
December 13 - Kathy Garver, actress, Family Affair
December 15 - Thaao Penghlis, actor, General Hospital, Days of Our Lives, Santa Barbara
December 17 - Chris Matthews, talk show host
December 22 – Diane Sawyer, television broadcast journalist
December 25 
Gary Sandy, actor, WKRP in Cincinnati
Paul Willson, actor
December 26 - John Walsh, television personality, America's Most Wanted, The Hunt with John Walsh
December 27 - Mark Johnson, television producer
December 30 
Davy Jones, singer, actor, The Monkees (died 2012)
Concetta Tomei, actress, China Beach, Providence

1945 in television